The American Legion Post No. 131 is a historic meeting hall on Center St. west of its junction with Walnut St., in Leslie, Arkansas.  It is a single-story log structure, with a gable roof that extends over the front porch, with large knee braces in the Craftsman style for support.  It was built in about 1935 with funding support from the Works Progress Administration (WPA).  Its log styling is typical of the Rustic architecture used in WPA projects.

The building was listed on the U.S. National Register of Historic Places in 1993.

See also
National Register of Historic Places listings in Searcy County, Arkansas

References

Buildings and structures completed in 1935
Buildings and structures in Searcy County, Arkansas
American Legion buildings
Clubhouses on the National Register of Historic Places in Arkansas
National Register of Historic Places in Searcy County, Arkansas
Historic district contributing properties in Arkansas